Elaterite Butte is a  elevation summit located in The Maze District of Canyonlands National Park, in Wayne County, Utah. Elaterite Butte is composed of hard, fine-grained Wingate Sandstone, which is the remains of wind-borne sand dunes deposited approximately 200 million years ago in the Late Triassic. This Wingate sandstone overlays a 432-foot thick layer of the softer Chinle Formation. The top of this geological formation rises over 1,400 feet above Elaterite Basin. The butte and basin are named for elaterite, which is a dark brown, tar-like, elastic mineral resin that seeps from parts of the nearby White Rim Sandstone. Access to the remote butte is via a four-wheel drive road in Elaterite Basin. Precipitation runoff from Elaterite Butte drains into the nearby Green River, which in turn is within the Colorado River drainage basin.

Climate
Spring and fall are the most favorable seasons to visit Elaterite Butte. According to the Köppen climate classification system, it is located in a Cold semi-arid climate zone, which is defined by the coldest month having an average mean temperature below −0 °C (32 °F) and at least 50% of the total annual precipitation being received during the spring and summer.

See also
 Colorado Plateau
 Geology of the Canyonlands area

References

External links

 Canyonlands National Park National Park Service
 Elaterite Butte: weather forecast

Landforms of Wayne County, Utah
Colorado Plateau
Canyonlands National Park
Sandstone formations of the United States
Buttes of Utah